Alan W Campbell (born 9 May 1983) is a British sculler.

Biography
Alan Campbell was born in Coleraine, Northern Ireland, and started rowing for his school, Coleraine Academical Institution for Boys.  ON leaving, he joined Bann Rowing Club Coleraine. Years later he then left for London and joined Tideway Scullers School.

In 2003, Campbell left his degree and won the Diamond Sculls at Henley Royal Regatta. He then made his international debut at the World U23 Championships in 2003, where he was forced to switch from the double to the single sculls five days before the regatta when his sculling partner became ill. Despite this he finished 8th.

He competed in the quadruple sculls at the 2004 Summer Olympics, finishing in 12th place. In 2005, Campbell won the men's single at the GB Selection Trials, and raced in the men's quad for the World Cup series, winning the bronze at Lucerne regatta. At the 2005 World Championships in Gifu, Japan, the men's quad narrowly failed to reach the final.

In 2006, Campbell switched to competing in the men's heavyweight single, and won the Munich world cup regatta ahead of Olaf Tufte. He also finished second in Lucerne, behind Mahé Drysdale, and fourth in Poznań, to win the overall world cup standings.

Campbell competed in the 2008 Olympics in Beijing where he participated in the Men's Single Scull; he led up to 1000m, where he was overtaken by Olaf Tufte and finished fifth. Prior to the games, he had picked up a virus that required knee surgery, which left him on crutches for three weeks in June 2008. He competed at the 2011 World Rowing Championships in Bled, where he won a bronze medal in the singles scull.

In the 2012 London Olympics, Campbell won the bronze medal in the men's single sculls after moving into the medals with 500m to go against the Swedish national entry, Lassi Karonen. Alan Campbell, the Olympic single scull bronze medallist in 2012, dominated 5 km GB Rowing Team Assessment in Boston, Lincs to win the open men's single scull event in a time of 17:03.23.

Events

Henley Royal Regatta
 2003 – Diamond Challenge Sculls racing as Tideway Scullers School
 2007 – Diamond Challenge Sculls racing as Tideway Scullers School
 2011 – Diamond Challenge Sculls racing as Tideway Scullers School

Wingfield Sculls
 2006
 2009
 2010
 2012

Scullers Head of the River
 2004 – 3rd
 2008 – 1st
 2012 – 1st

Alan Campbell also works as a speaker.

References

External links

 
 
 
 
 Wilson, Campbell, Craig and Lee Green win in Boston

1983 births
Living people
People from Coleraine, County Londonderry
British male rowers
Rowers at the 2004 Summer Olympics
Rowers at the 2008 Summer Olympics
Olympic rowers of Great Britain
People educated at Coleraine Academical Institution
Rowers at the 2012 Summer Olympics
Olympic bronze medallists for Great Britain
Olympic medalists in rowing
Medalists at the 2012 Summer Olympics
Sportspeople from County Londonderry
World Rowing Championships medalists for Great Britain
Rowers from Northern Ireland
Rowers at the 2016 Summer Olympics